Age of Love is an American reality TV dating series that ran for one season in Summer 2007.

The show featured 30-year-old Australian tennis star Mark Philippoussis as he looked for love among a group of women ranging in age from their early 20s to their late 40s.

Hosted by Mark Consuelos, the series aired on NBC, premiered on Monday, June 18, 2007. The last episode aired on August 6, 2007, in which 25-year-old Amanda Salinas was chosen as the winner.

Format
The contestants were divided in two age groups. The "kittens" were the women in their 20s, while the "cougars" were the women in their late 30s to late 40s. Each week Philippoussis would accompany one or two of the women on a private date, and at the end of each episode would ask all but one of the women if they would continue to see him. The rejected woman would be eliminated; this continued each week until just one remained. For the show's season finale, the final three contestants flew to Philippoussis' hometown of Melbourne, Australia to meet his family.

Contestants

Kittens

 Megan was chosen to be in Final 3 and on to the finale. On the finale, the girls and Mark had to take a plane to Australia to meet Mark's family. Megan was terrified of flying and refused to go on the plane, thereby eliminating herself from the competition.

Cougars

 Maria was shown in Episodes 4 and 6 as thinking of leaving. On Episode 7, when Mark asked Maria to stay, Maria told Mark she thought it wouldn't work out, which resulted in Maria eliminating herself.

Call-out order

 The contestant is in her 40s.
 The contestant is in her 20s.
 The contestant won the competition.
 The contestant was eliminated by Mark.
 The contestant decided to quit the competition.
 The contestant was automatically eliminated as her fear of flying prevented her from going to Australia for the finale.

Criticism
Critics noted Philippoussis was closer in age to the twenties than the forties.  He was only three to nine years older than the "kittens", while nine to 18 years younger than all of the "cougars".

Outcome

After the last episode of the show, Philippoussis refused to comment on the outcome of the relationship, stating that he was "concentrating on tennis". However, in a radio interview which aired on November 28 in Australia, he did state he was "currently single", and in February 2008 had been seen with model Siobhan Parekh. It was announced on October 26, 2009 that Philippousis was engaged to actress Jennifer Esposito, but had split by August 2010.

In 2009 it was revealed that Salinas and Philippoussis had stayed together for five months after meeting on the show. They split amicably in September 2007.

International broadcasters
The opening episode of Age Of Love in Australia, screening at 8:30pm in NSW, ACT and QLD, and at 9:30pm in other states, only managed to rate 849,000 mainland capital city viewers, rating behind both Channel Nine and ABC. Two weeks later, it was moved to a later timeslot of 10:30pm as ratings dropped to 545,000 viewers. The rights for the show in the UK were snapped up by E4, the digital channel from Channel 4 and is shown as part of their "No-Brainers" season along with other American reality TV shows like The Simple Life and Beauty and the Geek.

See also
 Who Wants to Marry a Multi-Millionaire? (2000)
 Flavor of Love (2006)
 Rock of Love with Bret Michaels (2007)

References

External links
Official Website (via Internet Archive)
Age of Love on BuddyTV
Age of Love on Reality TV World
Age of Love Review at Variety.com
I'm really in love, says Amanda on News.com.au
Episode clips from Age of Love
 

2000s American reality television series
2007 American television series debuts
2007 American television series endings
Television shows set in Los Angeles
American dating and relationship reality television series
NBC original programming